The 2014–15 Basketligaen was the 40th season of the highest professional basketball tier in Denmark.

Horsens IC took the title, by beating Bakken Bears 2–4 in the Finals. Team FOG Næstved beat Svendborg Rabbits 103–104 in the third-place play-off.

Regular season

Rounds 1-18

Rounds 19-27

Championship Playoffs

Relegation Playoffs

Awards

References

Basketligaen seasons
Danish
Basketball
Basketball